CCB may refer to:

Culture and religion
 Centro Cultural de Belém, a building with cultural facilities in Portugal
 Centro Cultural Brasileiro
 Christian Community Bible, a family of translations of the Christian Bible
 Christian Congregation in Brazil, is a Brazilian evangelical denomination
 Christian Council of Britain, an organization which campaigns against Islam
 Cole Canoe Base, a summer camp in mid-northern Michigan
 Communität Christusbruderschaft Selbitz, a German Lutheran Religious Order
 C-C-B, Japanese pop-rock band

Economics and finance
 Central Carolina Bank and Trust, formerly headquartered in Durham, North Carolina
 China Construction Bank, founded in the People's Republic of China in October, 1954
 China Construction Bank (Asia), the former Bank of Canton, founded in Hong Kong in 1912

Government and military
 Canada Child Benefit
 Capacete de Combate Balístico, a Brazilian ballistic helmet
 
 Civil Cooperation Bureau, an apartheid-era covert hit squad
 Close Combat Badge, a US Army badge that was never issued
 Combat Command-B, a level of military organization employed by the US Army from 1942 to 1963
 Coastal Command Boat, a prototype variant of the Mark VI patrol boat of the US Navy
 Combined Communications Board, original name of the CCEB military communications organisation

Science, medicine, and technology
 Calcium channel blocker, a class of drugs
 Center for Computational Biology, an NIH-funded center
 Centre for Cancer Biology at SA Pathology in Adelaide, Australia
 Change control board, (or Configuration Control Board), a committee that makes decisions on proposed changes to software projects
 Climate, Community & Biodiversity Alliance, which promotes development of responsible land management activities
 Coal combustion byproducts, such as fly ash
 Cold conveyor belt, a counterpart to the warm conveyor belt in certain cyclone models
 Common Core Booster, first stage of the Atlas V rocket
 Critical Care Bypass, a hospital emergency code
 Crowd control barrier, a device used to control the movement of people
 Computer Control Bus a propriety interface of Sanyo
Community Centered Board, an organization that fits an individual who needs medical support, to facilities that can assist said individual.

Other uses
 Clarens–Chailly–Blonay Railway, a former railway company in Switzerland
 Cable Airport (IATA airport code CCB) in Upland, California
 Cross car beam, structural member located under the instrument panel of most vehicles

See also

 CB (disambiguation)
 CBB (disambiguation)
 C2B
 2cb